The Circuit des 24 Heures du Mans, also known as Circuit de la Sarthe (after the 1906 French Grand Prix triangle circuit) located in Le Mans, Sarthe, France, is a semi-permanent motorsport race course, chiefly known as the venue for the 24 Hours of Le Mans auto race. The capacity of the race stadium, where the short Bugatti Circuit is situated, is 100,000. The Musée des 24 Heures du Mans is a motorsport museum located at the main entrance of the venue.

Up to 85% of the lap time is spent on full throttle, putting immense stress on engine and drivetrain components.

Track modifications
The road racing track, which was a triangle from Le Mans down south to Mulsanne, northwest to Arnage, and back north to Le Mans, has undergone many modifications over the years, with CIRCUIT N°15 being in use since 2018.

In the 1920s, the cars drove from the present pits on Rue de Laigné straight into the city, and after a sharp right-hand corner near the river Huisne Pontlieue bridge (a hairpin permanently removed from the circuit in 1929), before exiting the city again on the rather straight section now named Avenue Georges Durand after the race's founder. Its frighteningly narrow pit straight was further narrowed to make room for the pits and was part of the road itself, without the road becoming wider around the pits, and no separation.

Car speeds increased dramatically in the 1960s, pushing the limits of  the "classic circuit" and sparking criticism of the track as being unsafe after several trials related fatalities occurred. In 1965, a smaller, but permanent, Bugatti Circuit was added which shares the pit lane facilities and the first corner (including the famous Dunlop bridge) with the full "Le Mans" circuit. For the 1968 race, the Ford chicane was added before the pits to slow down the cars. The circuit was fitted with Armco for the 1969 race. The "Maison Blanche" kink was particularly harrowing, claiming many cars over the years (including three Ferrari 512 variants) and several lives, including the legendary John Woolfe in 1969 behind the wheel of a 917 Porsche. That year, Armco was added to the pit straight to separate the track from the pits. In 1972, the race track was considerably revamped, at a cost of 300 million francs, with modification of the pit area and the first and final straights, the addition of the quick Porsche curves bypassing "Maison Blanche", the signalling area was moved to the exit of the slow Mulsanne corner, and the track was resurfaced.

In 1979, due to the construction of a new public road, the profile of "Tertre Rouge" had to be changed. This redesign led to a faster double-apex corner and saw the removal of the second Dunlop Bridge. In 1986, construction of a new roundabout at the Mulsanne corner demanded the addition a new portion of track in order to avoid the roundabout. This created a right hand kink prior to Mulsanne corner.

As the Hunaudières leads to the village of Mulsanne, it is often called the Mulsanne Straight in English, even though the proper Route du Mulsanne is the one from or to Arnage.

After exiting the Tertre Rouge corner, cars spent almost half of the lap at full throttle, before braking for Mulsanne Corner. The Porsche 917 long tail, used from 1969 to 1971, had reached . Speeds on the straight by the Group C prototypes reached over  during the late 1980s. Jean-Louis Lafosse and Jo Gartner would ultimately suffer from fatal high speed accidents in 1981 and 1986, respectively, leading to concerns with the growing speeds on the  straight.

As the combination of high speed and high downforce caused tyre and engine failures, two roughly equally spaced chicanes were consequently added to the Mulsanne Straight before the 1990 race to limit the maximum achievable speed. In 1994, the Dunlop chicane was tightened.

In 2002, the run to the Esses was reconfigured in the wake of renovations to the Bugatti Circuit. The Le Mans circuit was changed between the Dunlop Bridge and Esses, with the straight now becoming a set of fast sweeping turns. This layout allowed for a better transition from the Le Mans circuit to the Bugatti circuit. This layout change would also require the track's infamous carnival to be relocated near the Porsche curves, and in 2006, the ACO redeveloped the area between the Dunlop Curve and Tertre Rouge, moving the Dunlop Chicane in even tighter to create more run-off area, while also turning the area after the Dunlop Chicane into an even larger set of fast, sweeping turns, known as the Esses en route to Tertre Rouge. As part of the development, a new extended pit lane exit was created for the Bugatti Circuit. This second pit exit re-enters the track just beyond the Dunlop Chicane and before the Dunlop Bridge.

Following the fatal crash of Danish driver Allan Simonsen at the 2013 race at the exit of Tertre Rouge into D338, Tertre Rouge was re-profiled again. The current version of the track has been in use since 2018.

Layout evolution of Circuit de la Sarthe

Lap records

Fastest race laps of Circuit de la Sarthe 

The official fastest race lap records at the Circuit de la Sarthe for different classes are listed as:

Speed record
In 1988, Team WM Peugeot were well aware of their slim chance of winning the 24-hour endurance race outright, but they knew that their Welter Racing designed car had exceptional straight line aerodynamics.

Roger Dorchy and Claude Haldi would be the drivers of car 51 while Pascal Pessiot and Jean-Daniel Raulet would drive the team's other car (#52). The latter lasted only 22 laps, and car 51 went into the pits around 17:00 in the afternoon with engine problems. After spending 3.5 hours in the pits, the team had the car back on the track and they decided to go for it. The Peugeot retired shortly after that (on lap 59) with an overheating engine. By then it had outlasted two other Group C1 entrants.

Since Peugeot had just launched its new model 405, the team agreed to advertise the new record as "405".

Bugatti Circuit

Bugatti Circuit is a  permanent race track located within Circuit des 24 Heures, constructed in 1965 and named after Ettore Bugatti. The circuit uses a part of the larger circuit and a separate, purpose-built section. The sections of track on the Bugatti Circuit that are on the Circuit des 24 Heures include the Ford Chicane at the end of the lap, the pit complex, and the straight where the Dunlop Tyres bridge is located. At this point in the overlapping section of the tracks there is a left-right sweep that was added for motorcycle safety in 2002. Vehicles turning to the left continue onto the Circuit des 24 Heures, toward Tertre Rouge and Mulsanne, vehicles turning to the right at La Chapelle will continue the Bugatti Circuit. The infield section features Garage Vert, a back straight, the 'S' du Garage Bleu, and Raccordement, which joins back at the Ford chicane.

The track was home base for Pescarolo Sport, founded by famous French driver Henri Pescarolo. The circuit currently hosts the 24 Hours of Le Mans motorcycle race, and a round of the MotoGP Championship. The circuit also holds French motor club races and in the past has hosted rounds of the International Formula 3000 Championship and DTM (German Touring Car series).

In addition to motor racing, it is the venue for the 24 rollers, a 24h race on inline skates or quads.

The Bugatti Circuit was used for the 1967 French Grand Prix, though it would prove to be the only time the Formula One World Championship would use the circuit, and is the current host of the French motorcycle Grand Prix. It also forms the final round of the FIA European Truck Racing Championship, and was part of the World Series by Renault and 1988 Superbike World Championship seasons.

Fastest race laps of Bugatti Circuit 

The official fastest race lap records at the Bugatti Circuit are listed as:

Layout evolution of Bugatti Circuit

Events

 Current

 April: FIM Endurance World Championship 24 Heures Motos, Fun Cup
 May: Grand Prix motorcycle racing French motorcycle Grand Prix, MotoE World Championship French eRace
 June: FIA World Endurance Championship 24 Hours of Le Mans, Le Mans Cup, Ligier European Series, Ferrari Challenge Europe, Ferrari Challenge North America, Porsche Carrera Cup France, Porsche Carrera Cup Scandinavia
 July: Le Mans Classic
 September: European Truck Racing Championship 24 Heures Camions Le Mans

 Former

 Deutsche Tourenwagen Masters (2006, 2008)
 EuroBOSS Series (2002–2004)
 FIM CEV Moto3 Junior World Championship (2014–2019)
 FFSA GT Championship (1998–1999, 2001–2006, 2012–2015)
 French F4 Championship (2012–2016)
 Formula 3 Euro Series (2003, 2006, 2008)
 Formula One French Grand Prix (1967)
 Formula Renault 2.0 West European Cup (1971–1972, 1975–2006, 2008–2009)
 French Formula Three Championship (1966–1967, 1980–1981, 1986–2002)
 French Supertouring Championship (1976, 1978–1981, 1986, 1989–1994, 1998–2005)
 Grand Prix motorcycle racing Vitesse du Mans motorcycle Grand Prix (1991)
 International Formula 3000 (1986–1991)
 International Sports Racing Series (1998)
 NASCAR Whelen Euro Series (2009–2014)
 Sidecar World Championship (1969–1970, 1976, 1979, 1983, 1985, 1987, 1989–1991, 1995, 2007–2019, 2021–2022)
 Superbike World Championship (1988, 1990)
 World Series by Renault (2005–2006, 2008–2009, 2015)

Race results

Weather and climate
Météo France runs a weather station in Le Mans, which exhibits an oceanic climate (Köppen Cfb). With both the 24-hour races and the French MotoGP round being run before the peak of summer, high-profile races often have cool temperatures both in terms of ambient and track conditions with rainfall being a potential factor. Although nights cool off, sometimes into the single-digits, during the 24-hour car race, air frosts have never been recorded in June.

Notes

References

Sources

External links

Official website
RacingCircuits.info's history of Circuit de la Sarthe 
Trackpedia's guide to driving Le Mans
Satellite Picture by Google Maps
History and track maps 1921–2006
Trackpedia's guide to Le Mans Bugatti
Track Reviewers reviews of Le Mans

Le Mans
Sports venues in Sarthe
Le Mans
Le Mans
Buildings and structures in Le Mans
Le Mans
Le Mans
1923 establishments in France
Sport in Le Mans
Tourist attractions in Sarthe